The Interscholastic League of Honolulu (ILH) is an athletic activity league whose membership is primarily private secondary schools in Honolulu, Hawai'i. The ILH has 24 member schools with over 13,000 student athletes participating in 37 different sports including cross country, track and field, swimming and diving, football, baseball, basketball, soccer, canoe paddling, kayaking, air riflery, water polo, judo, cheerleading, and sailing.

History
The ILH was founded in 1909 with Punahou, Kamehameha and McKinley High School making up the original membership. A number of public and private institutions joined soon after to bolster membership. In 1911 the ILH passed a rule stating that all players must be students, after schools supplemented their teams with recent graduates.

Along with the large number of private institutions that composed the membership of the ILH, there were five public high schools situated in Honolulu that were original members of the league: Farrington High School, Kaimuki High School, McKinley High School, Roosevelt High School and Kalani High School. In 1970, these five schools left the ILH to join the Oahu Interscholastic Association, a league now comprising all the public secondary schools on the island, leaving the ILH membership composed primarily with private institutions.

Operations
The Interscholastic League of Honolulu is governed by a set of policies that cover aspects such as: eligibility of students, age limits, academic standing, sports participation, outside participation rules and a codified transfer policy between teams.

As a large number of schools in the ILH have very small enrollment numbers, many schools cannot field teams that require a large number of players such as football, baseball, wrestling, etc. In response to this problem, and to give their students a chance to compete in these sports, these schools pool their players together and play under the moniker "Pac-Five". Pac-Five participates in many of the various sports offered by the ILH. Unfortunately for this combined athletic program, the athletes are not allowed to participate and score as a team in state championship individual sports. In this case, the athletes from each school must compete under their own school name, making it extremely difficult to win team awards due to the failure to meet the minimum number of athletes participating in an event in order to achieve a high team score.

League events

Tournaments hosted by the Interscholastic League of Honolulu have always been some of the most popular events in the State of Hawaii. Events such as the old Thanksgiving Day football game would annually draw crowds upwards of 20,000 to Honolulu Stadium to watch the league crown its champion. Although the Turkey Day Game has long been defunct, avid fans still often commute from neighbor islands to O'ahu to attend conference games in a wide range of sports.

Member institutions

*Combined team

Former members

References

External links
Official website of the Interscholastic League of Honolulu
Pac Five website

Hawaii high school athletic conferences
Sports leagues established in 1909
1909 establishments in Hawaii